The 1983 Michigan Wolverines football team was an American football team that represented the University of Michigan in the 1983 Big Ten Conference football season. In their 15th season under head coach Bo Schembechler, the Wolverines compiled a 9–3 record (8–1 against conference opponents), lost to Auburn in the 1984 Sugar Bowl, and outscored all opponents by a total of 355 to 160.

The team's statistical leaders included tailback Rick Rogers with 1,002 rushing yards, quarterback Steve Smith with 1,420 passing yards and 2,087 yards of total offense, Sim Nelson with 494 receiving yards, and placekicker Bob Bergeron with 76 points scored.

Steve Smith was selected as the most valuable player on the Michigan team. Two Michigan offensive linemen, guard Stefan Humphries and center Tom Dixon, received first-team All-America honors. Six Michigan players (Humphries, Dixon, defensive linemen Al Sincich and Kevin Brooks, defensive back Evan Cooper, and placekicker Bob Bergeron) received first-team honors on the 1983 All-Big Ten Conference football team.

Prior to the season, head coach Bo Schembechler delivered the famous "The Team" speech which would go on to become an integral part of Michigan football lore.

Schedule

Game summaries

Washington State

    
    
    
    
    
    

On September 10, 1983, Michigan, ranked No. 1 preseason by Sports Illustrated, defeated Washington State, 20–17, before a crowd of 103,256 at Michigan Stadium. The game was played in extreme heat with the temperature reaching 100 degrees on the field. Washington State took a 17–14 lead with 9:42 left in the game after a 63-yard, 11-play drive capped by a two-yard touchdown run. The Wolverines responded with a 75-yard drive that included a 52-yard run by Rick Rogers. Rogers rushed for 124 yards on 19 carries. Quarterback David Hall scored the winning touchdown on a four-yard option run with 6:10 left in the game.

at Washington

    
    
    
    
    
    
    
    

On September 17, 1983, Michigan lost to Washington, 25–24, before a crowd of 60,638 at Husky Stadium in Seattle. After trailing 24-10 early in the fourth quarter, Washington scored two fourth-quarter touchdowns and successfully passed for a two-point conversion in the final minute of play. Washington quarterback Steve Pelluer completed 15 of 15 passes in the fourth quarter. Todd Schlopy missed what would have been a game-winning 32-yard field goal with four minutes remaining in the game.

Wisconsin

    
    
    
    
    
    
    
    
    
    

On September 24, 1983, Michigan defeated Wisconsin, 38–21, before a crowd of 77,708 at Camp Randall Stadium in Madison, Wisconsin. Michigan led, 32–7, at the end of the third quarter before Wisconsin mounted a fourth-quarter comeback. Michigan rushed for 351 yards in the game. Kerry Smith led with 107 yards on 22 carries. Brian Mercer added 64 yards and a touchdown on 10 carries, and Rick Rogers rushed for 59 yards and two touchdowns. The Wolverines passed for only 42 yards on five completions. Steve Smith also threw two interceptions.

Indiana

    
    
    
    
    
    
    
    
    
    

On October 1, 1983, Michigan defeated Indiana, 43–18, before a crowd of 104,126 at Michigan Stadium. Tailback Kerry Smith rushed for three touchdowns. Steve Smith rushed for 130 yards on 14 carries and completed six of 17 passes for 82 yards. Rick Rogers also rushed for 101 yards and a touchdown on 16 carries. Indiana quarterback Steve Bradley passed for 246 yards, but he also gave up four interceptions.

Michigan State

    
    
    
    
    
    
    
    

On October 8, 1983, Michigan defeated Michigan State, 42–0, before a crowd of 78,033 at Spartan Stadium in East Lansing, Michigan. It was Bo Schembechler's 100th Big Ten coach victory and George Perles' first year as head coach of the Spartans.

Northwestern 

    
    
    
    
    

On October 15, 1983, Michigan defeated Northwestern, 35–0, before a crowd of 103,914 at Michigan Stadium. Rick Rogers scored two rushing touchdowns.  Steve Smith also rushed for two touchdown and threw for another on a two-yard pass to Dan Rice.

Iowa

    
    
    
    
    
    
    

On October 22, 1983, Michigan, ranked No. 10, defeated No. 12 Iowa, 16–13, before a homecoming crowd of 104,559 at Michigan Stadium. Bob Bergeron kicked three field goals, including the game-winning 45-yard field with eight seconds left in the game. The game-winning drive began when Michigan linebacker Rodney Lyles recovered an Owen Gill fumble with 90 seconds left in the game. Rick Rogers also scored a touchdown on a four-yard run in the third quarter.

Illinois

    
    
    
    
    

On October 29, 1983, Michigan lost to Illinois, 16–6, before a crowd of 76,127 at Memorial Stadium in Champaign, Illinois. It was the first time Illinois had beaten Michigan since 1966.  Illinois quarterback Jack Trudeau completed 21 of 37 passes for 271 yards, including touchdown passes of nine yard to Thomas Rooks and 46 yards to David Williams. Steve Smith completed 12 of 25 for 111 yards. Michigan was limited to two field goals by Bob Bergeron. Illinois went on to win the Big Ten championship.

Purdue

    
    
    
    
    
    
    
    

On November 5, 1983, Michigan defeated Purdue, 42–10, before a crowd of 104,946 at Michigan Stadium. Steve Smith completed 11 of 13 passes for 159 yards, and also rushed for 126 yards on 12 carries. Purdue's quarterback Scott Campbell was held to 118 passing yards and was intercepted three times.

Minnesota

    
    
    
    
    
    
    
    
    
    
    
    

On November 12, 1983, Michigan defeated Minnesota, 58–10, before a crowd of 40,945 at the Hubert H. Humphrey Metrodome in Minneapolis. Despite being pulled early in the third quarter, Steve Smith accounted for six touchdowns (three rushing, three passing) and compiled 327 yards in total offense (147 rushing, 180 passing).

Ohio State

    
    
    
    
    
    
    

On November 19, 1983, Michigan defeated Ohio State, 24–21, before  crowd of 106,115 at Michigan Stadium. Steve Smith ran for a touchdown and passed for two others, a 67-yard completion to Triando Markray in the first quarter and an eight-yarder to tight end Eric Kattus in the fourth quarter. Ohio State turned the ball over four times. Michigan drove to the one-yard line in the second quarter, but the Ohio State defense held, and Michigan missed a field goal attempt on fourth down. The Wolverines trailed at the start of the fourth quarter, but rallied for two touchdowns in the fourth quarter. The go-ahead touchdown followed a Brad Cochran interception at midfield which he returned to Ohio State's 28-yard line.

1984 Sugar Bowl

On January 2, 1984, Michigan lost to Auburn, 9–7, in the 1984 Sugar Bowl, played before a crowd of 77,893 at the Louisiana Superdome in New Orleans. Michigan took the lead on a four-yard touchdown run by Steve Smith in the first quarter.  Michigan was unable to score again, and Auburn came back on three field goals by Al Del Greco. Del Greco's final field goal occurred with 23 seconds remaining in the game. Bo Jackson rushed for 130 yards on 22 carries and was selected as the game's most valuable player.

Award season
Two Michigan players received first-team honors on the 1983 All-America team:
 Offensive guard Stefan Humphries received first-team honors from the Football Writers Association of America, United Press International, and The Sporting News. He also received second-team honors from the Associated Press, Gannett News Service, and Newspaper Enterprise Association. 
 Center Tom Dixon received first-team honors from the American Football Coaches Association, Associated Press, and The Sporting News.

Six Michigan players received first-team honors from the Associated Press (AP) and/or United Press International (UPI) on the 1983 All-Big Ten Conference football team: offensive guard Stefan Humphries (AP-1, UPI-1), center Tom Dixon (AP-1, UPI-1), placekicker Bob Bergeron (AP-1), defensive lineman Kevin Brooks (AP-2, UPI-1), defensive lineman Al Sincich (AP-1, UPI-2), and defensive back Evan Cooper (AP-1, UPI-2). Four others received second-team honors: linebacker Mike Mallory (AP-2, UPI-2); linebacker Carlton Rose (AP-2, UPI-2); running back Rick Rogers (UPI-2); and offensive guard Jerry Diorio (AP-2).

Team awards were presented as follows:
Most Valuable Player: Steve Smith
Meyer Morton Award: Steve Smith
John Maulbetsch Award: Bob Perryman
Frederick Matthei Award: Al Sincich
Arthur Robinson Scholarship Award: Stefan Humphries
Dick Katcher Award: Carlton Rose
Robert P. Ufer Award: Jeff Cohen

Personnel

Offense
Greg Armstrong, fullback, senior, Middletown, Ohio - started 4 games at fullback
Art Balourdos, center, junior, Chicago, Illinois 
Vincent Bean, split end, senior, Southfield, Michigan - started all 12 games at split end
Milt Carthens, tight end, senior, Pontiac, Michigan
Dan Decker, quarterback, sophomore, Roseville, Michigan
Jerry Diorio, offensive guard, senior, Youngstown, Ohio - started all 12 games at left offensive guard 
Tom Dixon, center, senior, Fort Wayne, Indiana - started all 12 games at center
Jumbo Elliott, offensive tackle, freshman, Lake Ronkonkoma, New York
Eddie Garrett, fullback, sophomore, Milwaukee, Wisconsin - started 6 games at fullback
David Hall, quarterback, senior, Livonia, Michigan - started 1 game at quarterback
Mark Hammerstein, offensive line, sophomore, Wapakoneta, Ohio
Jim Harbaugh, quarterback, sophomore, Palo Alto, California 
Ken Higgins, wide receiver, freshman, Battle Creek, Michigan - started 1 game at flanker
Stefan Humphries, offensive guard, senior, Broward, Florida - started all 12 games at right offensive guard 
Jerald Ingram, fullback, senior, Beaver, Pennsylvania
Doug James, offensive guard, senior, Louisville, Kentucky - started all 12 games at right offensive tackle                
Gilvanni Johnson, wide receiver, sophomore, Detroit, Michigan - started 4 games at flanker
Eric Kattus, tight end, junior, Cincinnati, Ohio
Ben Logue, running back, sophomore, Atlanta, Georgia
Triando Markray, wide receiver, sophomore, Detroit, Michigan - started 7 games at flanker 
Brian Mercer, tailback, junior, Cincinnati, Ohio
Clay Miller, offensive tackle, junior, Norman, Oklahoma - started all 12 games at left offensive tackle
Sim Nelson, tight end, junior, Fort Wayne, Indiana - started all 12 games at tight end
Bob Perryman, running back, sophomore, Buzzards Bay, Massachusetts
Dan Rice, running back, sophomore, Roxbury, Massachusetts - started 2 games at fullback
Rick Rogers, running back, junior, Inkster, Michigan - started 11 games at tailback
Kerry Smith, running back, senior, Grand Rapids, Michigan - started 1 game at tailback
Steve Smith, quarterback, senior, Grand Blanc, Michigan - started 09 games at quarterback
Larry Sweeney, center, senior, Alma, Michigan
Gerald White, running back, freshman, Titusville, Florida
Thomas Wilcher, tailback, sophomore, Detroit, Michigan
Dan Yarano, offensive guard, senior, Zanesville, Ohio

Defense
Jeffery Akers, outside linebacker, junior, Lynn, Massachusetts
Timothy Anderson, inside linebacker, junior, Ann Arbor, Michigan - started 6 games at inside linebacker
Mike Boren, inside linebacker, senior, Columbus, Ohio - started 4 games at inside linebacker 
Kevin Brooks, defensive tackle, junior, Detroit, Michigan - started all 12 games at defensive tackle
Fritz Burgess, defensive back, senior, Pasadena, California
Brad Cochran, defensive back, junior, Royal Oak, Michigan - started all 12 games at strong-side cornerback
Jeff Cohen, defensive back, senior, Farmington Hills, Michigan
Evan Cooper, defensive back, senior, Miami, Florida - started all 12 games (8 at strong safety, 4 at free safety)
Vincent DeFelice, defensive tackle, senior, Trenton, Michigan - started 11 games at defensive tackle
John Ferens, defensive back, senior, Toledo, Ohio
Tony Gant, linebacker, sophomore, Fremont, Ohio - started 8 games at free safety
Joe Gray, linebacker, junior, Detroit, Michigan
Mike Hammerstein, defensive tackle, junior, Wapakoneta, Ohio - started 1 game at defensive tackle
Thomas J. Hassel, outside linebacker, senior, Cincinnati, Ohio - started 6 games at outside linebacker 
Dieter Heren, defensive back, sophomore, Fort Wayne, Indiana
Jim Herrmann, inside linebacker, senior, Dearborn Heights, Michigan
Rich Hewlett, defensive back, senior, Plymouth, Michigan - started 4 games at strong safety 
John Lott, defensive back, senior, Masury, Ohio - started all 12 games at weak-side cornerback 
Rodney Lyles, outside linebacker, senior, Miami, Florida - started 11 games at outside linebacker
Doug Mallory, defensive back, freshman, DeKalb, Illinois
Mike Mallory, inside linebacker, junior, DeKalb, Illinois - started all 12 games at inside linebacker
Dave Meredith, defensive tackle, senior, Sterling Heights, Michigan 
Andy Moeller, inside linebacker, sophomore, Ann Arbor, Michigan
Mike Reinhold, inside linebacker, sophomore, Muskegon, Michigan - started 2 games at inside linebacker
Garland Rivers, defensive back, freshman, Canton, Ohio
Nathaniel Rodgers, middle guard, senior, Warren, Ohio
Carlton Rose, outside linebacker, senior, Ft. Lauderdale, Florida - started 6 games at outside linebacker 
James Scarcelli, outside linebacker, junior, Warren, Michigan - started 1 game at outside linebacker
Alan Sincich, middle guard, junior, Cleveland, Ohio - started all 12 games at middle guard 
Michael Wilson, defensive tackle, senior, Detroit, Michigan

Kickers
Bob Bergeron, place-kicker, senior, Fort Wayne, Indiana
Don Bracken, punter, senior, Thermopolis, Wyoming
Todd Schlopy, place-kicker, senior, Orchard Park, New York

Professional football
Fifteen members of the 1983 football team went on to play professional football.  
Don Bracken (Green Bay Packers 1985–90, Los Angeles Rams 1992-93)
Kevin Brooks (Dallas Cowboys 1985–88, Detroit Lions 1989-90) 
Milt Carthens (Indianapolis Colts 1987) 
Evan Cooper (Philadelphia Eagles 1984–87, Atlanta Falcons, 1988-89)
Jerry Diorio (Detroit Lions 1987)
Jumbo Elliott (New York Giants 1988–95, New York Jets 1996–2000, 2002)
Mike Hammerstein (Cincinnati Bengals 1986-90)
Jim Harbaugh (Chicago Bears 1987–1993, Indianapolis Colts 1994–1997, Baltimore Ravens 1998, San Diego Chargers 1999–2000, Carolina Panthers 2001)
Stefan Humphries (Chicago Bears 1984–86, Denver Broncos 1987-88)
Eric Kattus (Cincinnati Bengals 1986–91, New York Jets 1992) 
Bob Perryman (New England Patriots 1987–90, Denver Broncos 1991-92)
Garland Rivers (Chicago Bears 1987, Albany Firebirds 1990–91, Arizona Rattlers 1992–93)
Carlton Rose (Washington Redskins 1987)
Gerald White (Dallas Cowboys 1987)

Coaching staff
Head coach: Bo Schembechler
Assistant coaches:
 Gary Moeller - assistant head coach and defensive coordinator
 Lloyd Carr - defensive backfield coach
 Milan Vooletich - linebackers coach
 Jerry Meter - defensive line coach
 Jerry Hanlon - quarterbacks coach
 Tirrel Burton - running backs coach
 Bob Thornbladh - wide receivers coach
 Elliot Uzelac - offensive line coach
 Paul Schudel - offensive interior line coach
 Alex Agase
 Bob Chmiel

Trainer: Russ Miller
Manager: Paul Gehkas, Douglans Ham, Kenneth Pefkins, Robert Reid

Statistics

Rushing

Passing

Receiving

Scoring

References

External links
  1983 Football Team -- Bentley Historical Library, University of Michigan Athletics History

Michigan
Michigan Wolverines football seasons
Michigan Wolverines football